Koryta may refer to places:

Czech Republic
Koryta (Mladá Boleslav District), a municipality and village in the Central Bohemian Region
Koryta (Plzeň-North District), a municipality and village in the Plzeň Region
Koryta, a village and part of Bezděkov (Klatovy District) in the Plzeň Region
Koryta, a village and part of Kostelec nad Orlicí in the Hradec Králové Region

Poland
Koryta, Łódź Voivodeship (central Poland)
Koryta, Masovian Voivodeship (east-central Poland)
Koryta, Podlaskie Voivodeship (north-east Poland)
Koryta, Greater Poland Voivodeship (west-central Poland)
Koryta, Lubusz Voivodeship (west Poland)
Koryta, Pomeranian Voivodeship (north Poland)
Koryta, Gmina Sierakowice in Pomeranian Voivodeship (north Poland)